On Earth is the second and final studio album by American singer Traci Braxton. The album was released on August 24, 2018, through Soul World Entertainment. The album was preceded by the release of one single—"Lifeline" and one promotional single "Broken Things" featuring Toni Braxton, Towanda Braxton and Trina Braxton. The album features production for Dave "DaveyBoy" Lindsey (Monica, Missy Elliott) and production duo Chris N Teeb (Jennifer Lopez, Danity Kane).

Background and release
Following the release of her debut studio album Crash & Burn (2014), work began on her second studio album in late 2015. On May 17, 2016, during a Facebook live video on the Braxton Family Values page it was announced that Braxton would release a new single in 2016 titled "Body Shots" from her upcoming second studio album. On an episode of Braxton Family Values, Braxton and her sisters Toni, Towanda and Trina Braxton recorded "Broken Things" in the studio which was later added to the album. On March 23, 2018, on Soul World Entertainment's YouTube channel, uploaded two short episodes of a behind the scenes look on the recording process of the album titled "Traci Braxton Now or Never".

"Broken Things" was released as a buzz single to promote the upcoming release of "On Earth" on April 11, 2018. On August 3, 2018, Braxton released her official lead single, "Lifeline". On August 17, 2018, Braxton announced via social media that her album "On Earth" was available for pre-order, announcing the release date, August 24, 2018. Two days later, Braxton revealed the album cover on her social media pages.

Upon, release the album debuted at number 24 on the Billboard R&B Album Sales chart.

Singles
"Lifeline" was released as the album's lead single on August 5, 2018.

Promotional songs
"Broken Things" featuring Toni Braxton, Towanda Braxton and Trina Braxton was released as the album's promotional single on April 11, 2018, via several streaming services.

Track listing

Release history

References

2018 albums
Traci Braxton albums